The WAGR ADG class was an 18 member class of diesel railcars operated by the Western Australian Government Railways between 1954 and 1992.

History
Having trialled Governor railcars on the Perth suburban network, in September 1951 an order was placed with Cravens, Sheffield for 18 diesel railcars with all delivered in 1954. An additional four were delivered for country operation as the ADH class. Midland Railway Workshops built nine AYE trailer cars on the second hand underframes that were operated between two ADGs to operate as three car sets. These were replaced by ADAs in 1962.

In 1963/64, the ADGs were fitted with superchargers and between 1969 and 1973 with Voith transmissions. In the mid-1980s, some were fitted with larger AEC 11.3 litre engines from withdrawn ADX railcars while others received new Mercedes-Benz engines. Most lasted until 1992 when replaced by electric trains.

Two have been preserved by the Hotham Valley Railway and three by Rail Heritage WA.

References

Diesel multiple units of Western Australia
Train-related introductions in 1954